In applied probability, a dynamic contagion process is a point process with stochastic intensity that generalises the Hawkes process and Cox process with exponentially decaying shot noise intensity.

See also
 Point process
 Cox process
 Doubly stochastic model

References

Point processes